Zsófia Szabó (born 3 January 1997) is a Hungarian professional racing cyclist, who currently rides for UCI Women's Continental Team .

References

External links

1997 births
Living people
Hungarian female cyclists
Place of birth missing (living people)